Rafolatsane is a community council located in the Mokhotlong District of Lesotho. Its population in 2006 was 7,713.

Villages
The community of Rafolatsane includes the villages of Bochabela, Bokone, Ha Bulara, Ha Janteu, Ha Lehlohonolo, Ha Mofali, Ha Mosenki, Ha Motebang, Ha Motšeare (Chesa), Ha Motšeare (Tilimaneng), Ha Ntsebele, Ha Phate, Ha Phatoli, Ha Rafolatsane, Ha Ramaleshoane, Ha Setsoto, Hlomohang, Lekhalong, Letsatseng, Libekoaneng, Libibing, Likhameng, Liphokong, Mabeutung, Majakaneng, Maluba-lube, Mamphaneng, Manganeng, Maotleng, Masofeng, Masokong, Matlakeng, Matsekeng, Meeling, Mochochononong, Moeaneng, Molalana, Molumong, Motebang, Namoha, Nkokomale, Nqobelle, Sakaneng, Sekokong, Thajana, Thlakoaneng, Thoteng and Tšepeng.

References

External links
 Google map of community villages

Populated places in Mokhotlong District